Thailand competed at the 1972 Summer Olympics in Munich, West Germany. Thirty-three competitors, all men, took part in 21 events in seven sports.

Athletics

Men's 100 metres
Anat Ratanapol
 First Heat — DNS (→ did not advance)

Men's 4 × 100 m Relay
Boontud Jeanl, Surapong Ariyamongkol, Panus Ariyamongkol, and Anat Ratanapol 
 Heat — 41.04s (→ did not advance)

Boxing

Men's Light Flyweight (– 48 kg)
 Sripirom Surapong
 First Round — Lost to György Gedo (HUN), TKO-3

Cycling

Seven cyclists represented Thailand in 1972.

Individual road race
 Sataporn Kantasa-Ard — did not finish (→ no ranking)
 Sivaporn Ratanapool — did not finish (→ no ranking)
 Pramote Sangskulrote — did not finish (→ no ranking)
 Panya Singprayool-Dinmuong — did not finish (→ no ranking)

Team time trial
 Sataporn Kantasa-Ard
 Pinit Koeykorpkeo
 Sivaporn Ratanapool
 Panya Singprayool-Dinmuong

Sprint
 Taworn Tarwan
 Suriya Chiarasapawong

1000m time trial
 Suriya Chiarasapawong
 Final — 1:12.53 (→ 25th place)

Judo

Sailing

Shooting

Ten male shooters represented Thailand in 1972.

25 m pistol
 Solos Nalampoon
 Rangsit Yanothai

50 m pistol
 Sutham Aswanit
 Somsak Chaiyarate

50 m rifle, three positions
 Chawalit Kamutchati
 Preeda Phengdisth

50 m rifle, prone
 Udomsak Theinthong
 Chira Prabandhayodhin

Trap
 Damrong Pachonyut
 Boonkua Lourvanij

Weightlifting

References

External links
Official Olympic Reports

Nations at the 1972 Summer Olympics
1972 Summer Olympics
1972 in Thai sport